is a passenger railway station located in the city of Takaishi, Osaka Prefecture, Japan, operated by the private railway operator Nankai Electric Railway. It has the station number "NK16-1".

Lines

Layout
The station consists of two opposed unnumbered elevated side platforms with the station building underneath.

Platforms

Adjacent stations

History
Kyarabashi Station opened on October 2, 1918. Operations were suspended from May 22, 2021, due to construction work, and are expected to resume in 2024.

Passenger statistics
In fiscal 2019, the station was used by an average of 1539 passengers daily.

Surrounding area
 Hamadera Park
Takaishi Shrine

See also
 List of railway stations in Japan

References

External links

  

Railway stations in Japan opened in 1918
Railway stations in Osaka Prefecture
Takaishi, Osaka